The Lawrence Cabin is a log cabin located on Cobbs Creek in Powder Mill Valley Park in Havertown, Pennsylvania, near Nitre Hall.

History
Lawrence Cabin was built by Henry Lawrence sometime between 1690 and 1710. Originally located on Darby Creek, it was moved in 1961 when threatened with destruction.

A small log house, it is typical of the first homes originally built on the bank of Darby Creek at Old West Chester Pike by four early settlers, including David Lawrence. One of the early Welsh settlers in Haverford Township, David Lawrence emigrated with his wife Elinor Ellis and her family in 1684, and took up part of his father-in-law's land grant. His son Henry Lawrence then purchased  along Darby Creek in 1709. It has not been determined whether the log house pre-dates this purchase but a 2½ story stone addition was built circa 1730, and later a clapboard summer kitchen was added. It became known as the Three Generation House, and remained in Lawrence family ownership until 1942.

A large fireplace dominates the first floor room of Henry Lawrence's structure (Lawrence Cabin), with a ladder leading to the sleeping loft. The house is furnished appropriately in the period before 1750, and is used for the Colonial Living Experience provided by The Haverford Township Historical Society for elementary school students.

Modern usage 
Lawrence Cabin, along with Nitre Hall, are both utilized by the Haverford Township Historical Society in field trips taken by 5th graders from the local elementary schools.  Both sites are also available to be viewed by locals during the Haverford Heritage Festival, where local vendors sell food and trinkets.

References

External links
 
Lawrence Cabin at the Historic American Buildings Survey (HABS) (Library of Congress)

Historic American Buildings Survey in Pennsylvania
1730s establishments in Pennsylvania
Haverford Township, Pennsylvania
Houses in Delaware County, Pennsylvania
Museums in Delaware County, Pennsylvania
Historic house museums in Pennsylvania